Copenhagen International Film Festival (CIFF) was a film festival held annually in Copenhagen, Denmark from 2003 to 2008. The main prize, the Golden Swan, was awarded for Best Film, Best Director, Best Actress, Best Actor, Best Script and Best Cinematography.

In 2009, CIFF merged with the NatFilm Festival to become the CPH:PIX film festival.

Regular award winners

Other awards

2003
 Special Grand Prize of the Jury
 Rithy Panh (S21: The Khmer Rouge Killing Machine)
 The Special Jury Award
 Sylvain Chomet (The Triplets of Belleville (Les Triplettes de Belleville))

2004
 Grand Jury Special Prize
 Nina Choubina and Anna Ovsiannikova (The Granny)
 Special Lifetime Achievement Award
 Abbas Kiarostami
 The Hans Morten prize (70.000 Euro)
 Mette Heeno

2005
 Grand Prix du Jury
 The Death of Mr. Lăzărescu (Cristi Puiu)
 Honorary Award
 Nils Malmros
 Emir Kusturica

References

External links
 http://www.copenhagenfilmfestival.com/

Film festivals in Denmark
Festivals in Copenhagen